The Dubai Women's Tour is an annual professional road bicycle racing event for women in Dubai.

Winners

Classification leaders jerseys

References

Cycle races in Australia
Recurring sporting events established in 2018
2018 establishments in Australia
Women's road bicycle races
Annual sporting events in Australia